Chunk or chunky may refer to:


Fictional characters
 Chunk (comics), a DC Comics character
 Chunk (Toy Story 3), in the 2010 film Toy Story 3
 Chunk, in the 1985 film The Goonies
 Chunk Palmer, in Bull, a 2016 American TV series
 Chunk, in The ZhuZhus, a Canadian-American animated children's TV series

Other uses
 Chunk (cocktail) or tschunk, a cocktail
 Chunk (information), a fragment of information used in many multimedia formats
 Chunk Colbert (died 1874), Old West gunfighter
 Prince Chunk (1998–2010), a 44-pound cat

See also 
 
 
 C.h.u.n.k. 666, an American tall-bike club
 Chunkz, an English YouTuber
 Chunkzz, a 2017 Indian film
 Chunky (disambiguation)
 Chunking (disambiguation)